Typhoon Bualoi was a powerful Category 5 equivalent typhoon that caused damage across the coast of Japan. The fortieth  tropical depression, and the eleventh typhoon of the 2019 Pacific typhoon season, Bualoi originated from a disturbance east of the Marshall Islands on October 17, 2019 that quickly organized to a tropical depression on October 19, given the designated name 22W. Favorable conditions strengthened the depression into a tropical storm and received the name Bualoi. Bualoi rapidly intensified and became a typhoon on October 20.

The typhoon's rate of strengthening stopped on the following day, at which point became a Category 2-equivalent typhoon. Bualoi then underwent rapid intensification again and reached Category 4 strength on the same day. Bualoi reached its peak on October 22 as a Category 5-equivalent typhoon, with 10-minute sustained winds of 185 km/h (115 mph) and one-minute sustained winds of 260 km/h (160 mph). Bualoi rapidly weakened into a Category 3-equivalent typhoon on October 23 due to wind shear and continued before transitioning into a extratropical cyclone and dissipating on October 25, 2019.

Meteorological history 

On October 17, the Joint Typhoon Warning Center began monitoring a disturbance situated a couple hundred miles east of the Marshall Islands, and on October 19, the disturbance quickly organised into a tropical depression, giving it the numeral identifier 22W. Advisories began to be issued on the system as a conducive environment with very warm sea surface temperatures and low wind shear allowed 22W to strengthen. By October 19, it became Tropical Storm Bualoi and on the following day, entered a period of rapid intensification. Bualoi quickly became a severe tropical storm and then a typhoon soon afterwards. The rate of strengthening slowed until October 21, at which point Bualoi became a Category 2-equivalent typhoon on the Saffir-Simpson hurricane wind scale. The system then recommenced its rapid intensification, strengthening to Category 3 six hours later, and proceeded to steadily intensify further to Category 4 later the same day. 

Bualoi reached its peak intensity on October 22, with 10-minute sustained winds of 185 km/h (115 mph) and one-minute sustained winds of 260 km/h (160 mph), equivalent to a Category 5 major hurricane. The system rapidly weakened the following day on October 23, dropping to a category 3-equivalent typhoon. NASA-NOAA's Suomi NPP satellite revealed that Bualoi looked asymmetric due to the wind shear. The JTWC issued the final bulletin on Bualoi as it began to transition into an extratropical cyclone before dissipating on October 25, 2019.

Preparations, impact, and aftermath

Mariana Islands 

Ahead of Bualoi in the Mariana Islands, a Typhoon Warning was put in effect for the islands of Saipan and Tinian, with a Typhoon Watch in effect for Rota. Meanwhile, Tropical Storm Watches were posted for the islands of Alamagan, Pagan, and Guam. These were all discontinued by October 21. Northern Mariana Islands Lieutenant Governor Arnold Palacios placed the territory under Typhoon Condition 3 on October 19. This was upgraded to Typhoon Condition 4 by October 21. A federal emergency declaration was approved for the islands by the Trump administration. Schools and government buildings were closed with the threat of the typhoon on October 21. The Commonwealth Utilities Corp. turned off water access ahead of Bualoi as a precaution. As Bualoi neared its passage through the Mariana Islands, flash flood alerts and heavy rain warnings were put in effect.

The Federal Emergency Management Agency (FEMA) provided aid to the Northern Mariana Islands after U.S. president Donald Trump signed the emergency declaration from the Commonwealth on October 20.

Japan 
Japan, mainly the Chiba Prefecture, was still recovering from Typhoon Faxai and Typhoon Hagibis. Advisories were issued across the country and evacuations took place. Warm, moist air flowed into the typhoon and caused Bualoi to flow heavy rain upon the prefecture on October 24, despite not reaching land. 27 rivers were flooded, with landslides and floods occurring across various locations. 13 people were killed and 8 were injured, with half of the fatalities being caused by automobile accidents. About 3,199 houses were flooded or damaged. Total loss were finalized at US$200 million.

See Also 

 Weather of 2019
 Tropical cyclones in 2019

References

External links 

 General Information of Typhoon Bualoi (1921) from Digital Typhoon
 JMA Best Track Data of Typhoon Bualoi (1921) (in Japanese)
 JMA Best Track (Graphics) of Typhoon Bualoi (1921)

Bualoi
Bualoi